Nationality words link to articles with information on the nation's poetry or literature (for instance, Irish or France).

Events
 January 20 – Robert Frost recites his poem "The Gift Outright" at the Inauguration of John F. Kennedy as President of the United States.
February – American poet in London Sylvia Plath suffers a miscarriage. Several of her poems, including "Parliament Hill Fields", address this event.
 November – Liverpool poets Roger McGough, Adrian Henri and Brian Patten first meet, in a basement coffee bar on the city's Mount Pleasant.
 Keith and Rosmarie Waldrop buy a secondhand printing press and start Burning Deck magazine in the United States.
Tish literary magazine, founded in Vancouver, British Columbia. It is published intermittently until 1969. Poets associated with the magazine include Frank Davey, Fred Wah, George Bowering, and, briefly, bpNichol when he lives in Vancouver.
 Kyk-over-al magazine in Guyana ceases publication

Works published in English
Listed by nation where the work was first published and again by the poet's native land, if different; substantially revised works listed separately:

Canada
 Earle Birney, Ice Cod Bell on Stone
 Arthur Bourinot, Poems: Paul Bunyan, Three Lincoln Poems and Other Verse
 Leonard Cohen, The Spice-Box of Earth
 Robert Finch
Dover Beach Revisited, a meditation on the significance of Matthew Arnold
Acis in Oxford and Other Poems
 Ralph Gustafson, Rivers Among Rocks
 Daryl Hine, The Devil's Picture Books
 D. G. Jones, The Sun is Axeman
 Irving Layton, The Swinging Flesh
 Eli Mandel and Jean Guy Pilon, Poetry 62, an anthology
 Gwendolyn MacEwen:
 Selah. Toronto: Aleph Press.
 The Drunken Clock. Toronto: Aleph Press.
 D. Pacey, Creative Writing in Canada, revised edition (scholarship)
 Dorothy Roberts, Twice to Flame

Ireland
 Austin Clarke, Later Poems, Dublin: Dolmen Press, Ireland
 Thomas Kinsella:
 Downstream, Dublin: Dolmen Press
 Poems and Translations, New York: Atheneum

India in English
 Lila Ray, Entrance( Poetry in English ), Calcutta: Writers Workshop, India.
 Harindranath Chattopadhyaya, Masks and Farewells, Bombay: Asia
 Ira De, The Hunt and Other Poems ( Poetry in English ), Calcutta: Writers Workshop, India. (revised edition 1968)
 Sarojini Naidu, The Feather of the Dawn, posthumously published (died in 1949), edited by her daughter, Padmaja Naidu
 Trilok Chandra, A Hundred and One Flowers

United Kingdom
 James K. Baxter, Howrah Bridge and Other Poems, London: Oxford University Press, New Zealand poet published in the United Kingdom
 Thomas Blackburn, A Smell of Burning
 Alan Brownjohn, The Railings
 Charles Causley, Johnny Alleluia
 Jack Clemo, The Map of Clay
 Padraic Colum, Irish Elegies
 Donald Davie, New and Selected Poems, Middletown, Connecticut: Wesleyan University Press
 Paul Dehn, Quake, quake, quake: a leaden treasury of English verse
 Ian Hamilton Finlay, Glasgow Beasts, An a Burd, Edinburgh: Wild Flounder Press
 Roy Fisher, City
 John Fuller, Fairground Music
 Robert Graves, More Poems 1961
 Thom Gunn, My Sad Captains, and Other Poems, London: Faber and Faber; University of Chicago Press
 Geoffrey Hill, "Ovid in the Third Reich", "Locust Songs" and "Annunciations"
 Ralph Hodgson, Collected Poems
 David Holbrook, Imaginings
 Graham Hough, Legends and Pastorals
 Elizabeth Jennings, Song for a Birth or a Death, and Other Poems
 Jenny Joseph, "Warning"
 Edward Lucie-Smith, A Tropical Childhood, and Other Poems, including "The Witnesses", "The Fault", and "On Looking at Stubb's Anatomy of the Horse"
 Hugh MacDiarmid, pen name of Christopher Murray Grieve, The Kind of Poetry I Want
 Louis MacNeice, Solstices
 John Masefield, Bluebells, and Other Verse
 John Montague, The Nature of Cold Weather, London: MacGibbon and Kee
 Peter Porter, Once Bitten, Twice Bitten, by an Australian living in England, Northwood, Middlesex: Scorpion Press
 Peter Redgrove, The Collector, London: Routledge and Kegan Paul
 Siegfried Sassoon, Collected Poems
 C. H. Sisson, The London Zoo
 Iain Crichton Smith, Thistles and Roses
 Jon Stallworthy, The Astronomy of Love
 Gillian Stoneham, When That April
 R.S. Thomas, Tares, Welsh
 Marina Tsvetayeva, The Selected Poems of Marina Tsvetayeva, translated by Elaine Feinstein, Oxford University Press, first of four editions (and a much-revised fifth edition)
 John Wain, Weep Before God, including "Time Was", which won second prize in the  international Borestone Mountain Poetry Awards competition, London: Macmillan

Criticism, scholarship and biography in the United Kingdom
 William Empson, Milton's God
 Doris Landley Moore, The Late Lord Byron

United States
 Lee Anderson, Nags Head
 Helen Bevington, When Found, Make a Verse Of
 Paul Blackburn, The Nets
 Harold Bloom, John Hollander, editors, The Wind and the Rain
 Philip Booth, The Islanders
 Joseph Payne Brennan, The Wind of Time, Hawk & Whippoorwill Press August Derleth
 John Ciardi, In the Stoneworks
 Leonard Cohen, The Spice-Box of Earth
 Donald Davidson, The Long Street
 August Derleth, editor, Fire and Sleet and Candlelight
 Hilda Doolittle (H.D.), Helen in Egypt, a long retelling of the tale in lyrical prose and verse of the Helen of Troy tale
 Ed Dorn, The Newly Fallen, Totem Press
 Alan Dugan, Poems
 Abbie Houston Evans, Fact of Crystal
 Lawrence Ferlinghetti, Starting from San Francisco
 Arthur Freeman, Apollonian Poems
 George Garrett, Abraham's Knife
 Allen Ginsberg:
 Empty Mirror: Early Poems, New York: Totem/Corinth
 Kaddish and Other Poems, San Francisco: City Lights Books
 Horace Gregory, Medusa in Gramercy Park
 Thom Gunn, My Sad Captains, London: Faber and Faber; University of Chicago Press Briton
 Daryl Hine, Heroics
 John Hollander, The Untuning of the Sky (also see Harold Bloom/John Hollander item above)
 John Holmes, The Fortune Teller
 David Ignatow, Say Pardon
 LeRoi Jones, Preface to a Twenty Volume Suicide Note
 Carolyn Kizer, The Ungrateful Garden, Bloomington: Indiana University Press
 Maxine Kumin, Halfway
 Denise Levertov, The Jacob's Ladder, New York: New Directions
 Philip Levine, On the Edge
 Robert Lowell, Imitations
 W. S. Merwin:
 Translator, Some Spanish Ballads, London: Abelard (American edition: Spanish Ballads, 1961, New York: Doubleday Anchor)
 Editor, West Wind: Supplement of American Poetry, London: Poetry Book Society
 Pablo Neruda, Odas elementales, translated by C. Lozano and with an introduction by Fernando Alegría
 Lorine Niedecker, My Friend Tree (published with help from Ian Hamilton Finlay)
 John Nist, editor, Modern Brazilian Poetry
 Charles Olson:
The Maximus Poems
The Distances
 Hyam Plutzik, Horatio, a narrative monologue basically in blank verse
 Theodore Roethke, I Am! Says the Lamb
 May Sarton, Cloud, Stone, Sun, Vine
 Peter Viereck, The Tree Witch
 John Hall Wheelock, The Gardener
 Richard Wilbur, Advice to a Prophet
 James Wright and Robert Bly, translators, Twenty Poems of Georg Trakl (Austrian poet writing in German), The Sixties Press

Criticism, scholarship and biography in the United States
 Roger Asselineau, The Evolution of Walt Whitman
 Walter Lowenfels, editor, Walt Whitman's Civil War, Whitman's writing about the war
 Edwin Haviland Miller, The Correspondence of Walt Whitman (1842–1875, in two volumes)
 Archibald MacLeish, Poetry and Experience (autobiography)

Other in English
 James K. Baxter, Howrah Bridge and Other Poems, London: Oxford University Press, New Zealand poet published in the United Kingdom
 J. P. Clark, Poems (Nigeria)
 Allen Curnow, editor, Penguin Book of New Zealand Verse,
 A. D. Hope, Poems (Australia)
 Kenneth Slessor, The Penguin Book of Modern Australian Verse, Melbourne, Australia, anthology

Works published in other languages
Listed by language and often by nation where the work was first published and again by the poet's native land, if different; substantially revised works listed separately:

French language

Canada, in French
 Rina Lasnier, Mémoire sans jour
 Paul Marie Lapointe, Choix de poèmes
 Jean-Guy Pilon:
 La Mouette et le large
 Recours au pays, Montréal: l'Hexagone

France
 Andre du Bouchet, Dans la chaleur vacante
 Aimé Césaire,Cadastre, Martinique author published in France; Paris: Editions du Seuil
 Jean Cocteau, Le Cérémonial espagnol de Phoenix
 Michel Deguy, Poemes de la presqu'ile
 Max Pol Fouchet, Demeure le Secret
 Eugène Guillevic, Carnac
 Henri Michaux, Connaisance par les gouffres (Life Through Darkness: Exploration Through Drugs"), Paris: Gallimard
 Marie Noël, Chants d'arrière-saison
 Francis Ponge, Le Grand Recueil, three volumes
 Raymond Queneau, Cent mille milliards de poèmes
 Georges Schéhadé, Nocturnes
 Léopold Sédar Senghor, Nocturnes
 Jean Tardieu, Choix de poèmes

Criticism, scholarship and biography in France
 André Berry, editor, Anthologie de la poésie occitane
 Yves Bonnefoy, Rimbaud
 Saint-John Perse, Poésie: allocution au Banquet Nobel du 10 décembre 1960, Paris: Gallimard

Germany
 Johannes Bobrowski, Sarmatische Zeit
 Clemens Hesselhaus, editor, Deutsche Lyrik der Moderne: von Nietzsche bis Yvan Goll Düsseldorf: August Bagel an anthology

Criticism, scholarship and biography in Germany
 Wilhelm Emrich, Protest und Verheissung (criticism)
 Walter Jens, Deutsche Literatur der Gegenwart (criticism)

Hebrew
 J. Akavyahu, Manginot Hazot ("Midnight Music")
 Anonymous poet from a Soviet Bloc country, Behilokah Halail ("As the Night Is Taken"), the poems were clandestinely smuggled into Israel and published
 K. A. Bertini, Shevil Kahol ("Blue Path")
 A. Broides, El ha-Shahar ha-Gonuz ("Toward the Hidden Dawn")
 Yonah David, Shirim Le-lo Ahava ("Poems on Nonlove")
 Israel Efros, Bain Hofim Nistarim ("Among Hidden Shores")
 Hayim Guri, Shoshanat ha-Ruhot ("Rose of the Winds")
 Yosef Lichtenbaum, ba-Mishor ha-Govoha ("On a High Plain")
 E. Lisitzky, Kemo ha-Yom Rad ("As the Day Wanes") published in the United States
 Anda Pinkerfield-Amir, Gadish ve-Omer ("Sheaf and Measure")
 Gabriel Preil, Mapat Erew ("Map of Evening"), published in the United States
 T. Ribner, Shirim Limzo Et ("Poems in Search of Time")
 Rena Shani, Ir Zara ("Strange City")
 Nathan Zakh, Shirim Shonim ("Various")

Criticism, scholarship and biography in Hebrew
 B. Kurzweil, Bialik ve- Tchernichovsky — Mehkarim be-Shiratam, about aspects of the works of two important poets of the Hebrew literary renaissance

India
Listed in alphabetical order by first name:
 Akhtarul Imam, Yaden, Urdu-language
 Ayyappa Paniker, Kurukshetram (written 1952–1957), Malayalam-language
 Nirendranath Chakravarti; Bengali-language:
 Prothom Nayok, Kolkata: Surabhi Prokashoni
 Ondhokar Baranda, Kolkata: Krittibaash Prokashoni
 Kunwar Narain, Parivesh Hum Tum, Allahabad: Bharti Bahandar, Leader Press; Hindi-language

Italy
 Attilio Giuliani, editor, Novissimi, an anthology-cum-manifesto of five poets which, by 1965, will be "increasingly regarded as the principal event in Italian poetry in recent times"

Portuguese language

Portugal
 Ruy de Moura Belo, Aquele grande rio Eufrates ("That Great River, the Euphrates")
 Herberto Hélder, A Colher na Boca ("The Spoon in the Mouth")
 Mário Cesariny:
 Poesia
 Planisfério e Outros Poemas

Spanish language

Spain
 María Victoria Atencia, Cañada de los ingleses
 Miguel Hernández, a "complete" collection of poems (posthumous)
 Gerardo Diego, Glosa a Villamediana

Anthologies in Spain
 Jimenez Martos, editor, Nuevos poetas españoles, mostly on the work of the "Generation of '54"
 Rafael Montesinos, editor, Poesía taurina contemporánea, including verse by Miguel Hernández, Diego and García Lorca

Latin America
 Arturo Corcuera, Sombra del jardín
 Roque Dalton, La ventana en rel rostro (El Salvador)
 Hernando Domínguez de Camargo, Obras de Hernando Domínguez de Camargo (posthumous)
 Octavio Paz, Libertad bajo palabra collected poems previously published from 1935 to 1958 in a volume using the title of an earlier book of his
 Carlos A. Velazco, El corazón de silencio

Anthologies in Latin America
 Anuario del cuento mexicano (Mexico)
 Antonio Cisneros, Destierro, the author's first volume of poetry; Peru
 Ginés de Albareda and F. Garfias, editors, Antología de la poesía hispanoamericana, Volume 8, devoted to Chilean poetry

Yiddish

Israel
 Y Fridman, Di legende fun Neyakh Grin ("The Legend of Noah Green")
 L. Fuks, editor, Schemuelbuch, a scholarly edition of this old Yiddish epic
 Avrom Lev, a book of poetry
 Leyb Olitsky, a book of poetry
 Y Papernikov, a book of poetry
 Rikude Potash, a book of poetry
 Arye Shamri, Funken fun tikun ("Sparks of Salvation")
 Avrom Sutzkever, Di gaystike erd ("The Spiritual Soil")

Yiddish works published elsewhere
 Efrayim Oyerbakh, Di vayse shtot ("The White City")
 I. L. Kalushiner, a book of poetry
 Yisroel Emiot, In nigun ayngehert ("Listening to the Melody")
 David Sfard, A zegl in vint ("A Sail in the Wind") (Poland)

Other languages
 Dritëro Agolli, Hapat e mija në asfalt ("My steps on the pavement"), Albania
 Simin Behbahani, Marmar ("Marble"), Persia
 Syed Shamsul Haque, Ekoda Ek Rajje ("Once upon a time in a kingdom"), Bengali published in East Pakistan
 Alexander Mezhirov, Ветровое стекло ("Windshield" or "Windscreen"), Russia, Soviet Union
 Nizar Qabbani, My Beloved, Syrian poet writing in Arabic
 Klaus Rifbjerg, Camouflage, Denmark

Awards and honors

United Kingdom
 Eric Gregory Award: Adrian Mitchell, Geoffrey Hill

United States
 Consultant in Poetry to the Library of Congress (later the post would be called "Poet Laureate Consultant in Poetry to the Library of Congress"): Louis Untermeyer appointed this year.
 Pulitzer Prize for Poetry: Phyllis McGinley: Times Three: Selected Verse From Three Decades
 Bollingen Prize: Yvor Winters
 National Book Award for Poetry: Randall Jarrell, The Woman at the Washington Zoo
 Fellowship of the Academy of American Poets: Horace Gregory

Other
 Lenin Prize (Soviet Union): Alexander Tvardovsky for Za Dalyu dal ... ("Space Beyond Space")
 Canada: Governor General's Award, poetry or drama: Acis in Oxford, Robert Finch

Births
Death years link to the corresponding "[year] in poetry" article:
 May 2 – Lisa Bellear (died 2006), Australian indigenous poet
 May 4 – Ishita Bhaduri, Indian Poet and Author
 May 17 – Han Dong 韩东, Chinese poet and novelist
 June 5 – Swadesh Roy, Bengali journalist, essayist, poet, novelist and short-story writer
 August 14 – Steven Heighton, Canadian novelist and poet
 September 13 – Tom Holt, English historical and comic novelist and poet
 November 9 – Jackie Kay, Scottish poet and novelist
 December 20 – Sion Sono 園 子温, Japanese controversial avant-garde poet and filmmaker
 Also:
 Ifor ap Glyn, Welsh-language poet
 Gitaujali Badruddin
 Chen Kehua, Chinese poet and ophthalmologist in Taiwan
 Denise Duhamel, American
 Kenneth Goldsmith, American
 Maggie Helwig, English-born Canadian novelist, poet and Anglican priest
 Louis de Paor, Irish-language poet

Deaths
Birth years link to the corresponding "[year] in poetry" article:
 April 30 – Jessie Redmon Fauset, 79 (born 1885), American novelist and poet
 June 26 – Kenneth Fearing, 58 (born 1902), American poet and writer
 September 27 – Hilda Doolittle, aka "H.D.", 75 (born 1886), American poet, novelist and memoirist, of a heart attack
 December 24 – Robert Hillyer, 66 (born 1895), American poet

See also

 Poetry
 List of poetry awards
 List of years in poetry

Notes

Poetry
20th-century poetry